Jigozen (or Zigozen) is a Hiroden station on Hiroden Miyajima Line, located in Jigozen, Hatsukaichi, Hiroshima.

Routes
From Jigozen Station, there is one of Hiroden Streetcar routes.
 Hiroshima Station - Hiroden-miyajima-guchi Route

Connections
█ Miyajima Line

JA Hiroshimabyoin-mae — Jigozen — Ajina-higashi

Around station
Jigozen Fishing Port
Jigozen Shrine - the position of Mōri clan for Battle of Miyajima

History
Opened on July 15, 1925.

See also
Hiroden Streetcar Lines and Routes

References

Jigozen Station
Railway stations in Japan opened in 1925